The Turkish ambassador to Peru is the chief Turkish diplomat to Peru. The ambassador in Lima is also accredited to Bolivia.

Relations between Turkey and Peru were established in 1952, and resident embassies were opened by both states in 2010. The Turkish ambassador was previously accredited from Santiago de Chile.

List of representatives

See also
List of ambassadors of Peru to Turkey
Peru–Turkey relations

References

Peru
Turkey